The Mercyhurst Lakers represent Mercyhurst University in CHA women's ice hockey during the 2016-17 NCAA Division I women's ice hockey season.

Standings

Offseason
May 17: Emily Janiga, 2015-16 team captain signed with the Buffalo Beauts of the NWHL.

  

September 20:  Lyndsay Barch (Mercyhurst '04) was hired as an associate head coach.

Recruiting

Roster

2016–17 Lakers

Schedule

|-
!colspan=12 style=""| Regular Season

|-
!colspan=12 style=""| CHA Tournament

Awards and honors

Jessica Convery, CHA Goaltender of the month, December, 2016

Brooke Hartwick, Forward, All-CHA Second Team

Jillian Skinner, Defender, All-CHA Second Team

Maggie Knott, Forward, All-CHA Rookie Team

References

Mercyhurst
Mercyhurst Lakers women's ice hockey seasons
Mercy
Mercy